The 2022 FIVB Volleyball Women's Nations League was the fourth edition of the FIVB Volleyball Women's Nations League, an annual women's international volleyball tournament. The competition was held from 31 May to 17 July 2022, and the final round took place in Ankara Arena, Ankara Turkey.

Belgium were the last placed challenger team after the preliminary round and were replaced by 2022 Challenger Cup winners Croatia in the 2023 edition.

Italy claimed their first VNL medal and title after defeating Brazil in straight three sets. Brazil took their third silver medal, consecutively. Serbia won their first medal of the tournament, claiming the bronze after defeating finals hosts Turkey straight three sets. Paola Egonu of Italy named as the MVP of the tournament.

Qualification
As there was no promotion or relegation in the 2021 VNL, 15 of the same 16 teams in 2021 are competing in this year's edition.

On 1 March 2022, FIVB declared Russia and Belarus ineligible for international and continental competitions due to the ongoing war in Ukraine. As a result, Russia was out of the Nations League. On 5 April, the FIVB announced Bulgaria would replace Russia in the competition.

Format

Preliminary round
In the 2022 tournament, the format of play was changed. The new format will see 16 women's teams competing in pools of 8 teams during the pool phase. Each team plays 12 matches during the pool stage. Eight teams will then move into the final knockout phase of the competition.

Final round
The VNL Finals will see the seven strongest teams along with the finals host country Turkey  moving directly to the knockout phase as first placed team,and which will consist of eight matches in total: four quarterfinals, two semi-finals and the bronze and gold medal matches.

Final 8 direct elimination formula:

 The 1st ranked team will play a quarterfinal match against the 8th ranked team, the 2nd ranked team will play a quarterfinal match against the 7th ranked team, the 3rd ranked team will play a quarterfinal match against the 6th ranked team, the 4th ranked team will play a quarterfinal match against the 5th ranked team.
 The Host Team is placed in 1st position if the team is among the top 8 teams in the Final Standings after the VNL Preliminary Phase.
 The Host Team is placed in 8th position if the team is not among the top 8 teams in the Final Standings after the VNL Preliminary Phase.

Rule changes
 Court switch at the end of the sets was eliminated due to COVID-19 safety guidelines and for a better television broadcasts.
 Each team is allowed to call only one time-out during each set in preliminary. The time-out lasts 30 seconds long.
 Only one technical time-out is made when the leading team reaches 12 points.
 Two time-outs per set are given to all matches in the Finals, one of them can only be called before technical time-out.
 Live interview is introduced into matches during Set 2 and Set 3 in the Finals. Therefore, the breaks between Set 2 and Set 3 will extend to 5 minutes.

Pool composition
The overview of pools was released on 7 December 2021.

Venues

Preliminary round

Final round

Competition schedule

Pool standing procedure
 Total number of victories (matches won, matches lost)
 In the event of a tie, the following first tiebreaker will apply: The teams will be ranked by the most points gained per match as follows:
Match won 3–0 or 3–1: 3 points for the winner, 0 points for the loser
Match won 3–2: 2 points for the winner, 1 point for the loser
Match forfeited: 3 points for the winner, 0 points (0–25, 0–25, 0–25) for the loser
 If teams are still tied after examining the number of victories and points gained, then the FIVB will examine the results in order to break the tie in the following order:
Sets quotient: if two or more teams are tied on the number of points gained, they will be ranked by the quotient resulting from the division of the number of all sets won by the number of all sets lost.
Points quotient: if the tie persists based on the sets quotient, the teams will be ranked by the quotient resulting from the division of all points scored by the total of points lost during all sets.
If the tie persists based on the points quotient, the tie will be broken based on the team that won the match of the Round Robin Phase between the tied teams. When the tie in points quotient is between three or more teams, these teams ranked taking into consideration only the matches involving the teams in question.

Squads

Preliminary round

Ranking

|}
Source: VNL 2022 standings

Week 1

Pool 1
All times are Central Summer Time (UTC-05:00).
}}

|}

Pool 2
All times are Further-eastern European Time (UTC+03:00).
}}

|}

Week 2

Pool 3
All times are Brasília time (UTC−03:00).
|}

Pool 4
All times are Philippine Standard Time (UTC+08:00).
|}

Week 3

Pool 5
All times are Central Summer Time (UTC-06:00).
|}

Pool 6
All times are Eastern European Summer Time (UTC+03:00).
|}

Final round
All times are Further-eastern European Time (UTC+03:00).

Quarterfinals
|}

Semifinals
|}

3rd place match
|}

Final
|}

Final standing

Source: VNL 2022 final standings

Awards

Most Valuable Player

Best Setter

Best Outside Spikers

Best Middle Blockers

Best Opposite Spiker

Best Libero

Statistics leaders

Preliminary round
Statistics leaders correct as of Week 3 of preliminary round.

Final round
Statistics leaders correct as of final round.

See also
2022 FIVB Volleyball Men's Nations League
2022 FIVB Volleyball Men's Challenger Cup
2022 FIVB Volleyball Women's Challenger Cup

Notes

References

External links
Fédération Internationale de Volleyball – official website
FIVB Volleyball Nations League 2022 – official website

2022
FIVB
FIVB
FIVB
Nations
Sports competitions in Ankara
Sports events affected by the 2022 Russian invasion of Ukraine
Volleyball in Turkey
June 2022 sports events in the United States
Sports competitions in Louisiana
June 2022 sports events in Brazil
Sports competitions in Brasília
Sports competitions in Sofia
June 2022 sports events in Canada
July 2022 sports events in Canada
Sports competitions in Calgary
July 2022 sports events in Turkey
June 2022 sports events in Asia
FIVB Women's Nations League, 2022